Gregory Tarchaneiotes or Trachan[e]iotes (in Latin sources  and ) was an imperial  and the long-reigning catepan of Italy from 998 to 1006.

He assumed his office sometime after 1 September 998, in succession to John Ammiropoulos. Soon after, still in the same year, he confirmed the grant of a village to the abbot of Santa Maria del Rifugio in Tricarico. In the first year of his tenure, he captured the town of Gravina, which had risen in revolt, and took its leader, a certain Theophylact, prisoner.

In December 999, and again on February 2, 1002, he reinstituted and confirmed the possessions of the abbey and monks of Monte Cassino in Ascoli. In 1004, he fortified and expanded the castle of Dragonara on the Fortore. He gave it three circular towers and one square one. He also strengthened Lucera.

References

Sources

External links
Ascoli Nel Medioevo
The Reign of Basil II

10th-century births
11th-century deaths
Byzantine generals
11th-century catepans of Italy
10th-century Byzantine people
10th-century Italian people
Gregory
Protospatharioi